Antoine Hastoy (born 4 June 1997) is a French rugby union player. His position is fly-half and he currently plays for La Rochelle in the Top 14.

References

External links
France profile at FFR
La Rochelle profile
L'Équipe profile

1997 births
Living people
People from Bayonne
Sportspeople from Bayonne
French rugby union players
Section Paloise players
Stade Rochelais players
Rugby union fly-halves
France international rugby union players